The A37 is a major road in south west England.

Route
It runs north from the A35 at Dorchester in Dorset into Somerset through Yeovil and Shepton Mallet before terminating at the Three Lamps junction with the A4 in central Bristol.  The road is entirely single carriageway, except in the Yeovil and Bristol built-up areas, at Ilchester (where it multiplexes with the A303), and north of Dorchester.

Fosse Way
From the Podimore roundabout northeast of Ilchester to Shepton Mallet the route traces that of the Fosse Way.

The road today
The road is subject to a stream of speed restrictions where it winds through a number of small villages. These parts of the road can be dangerous, especially where wide vehicles pass on sections where buildings are close to the road.

History

1922 road classification 
The original A37 in 1922 started in Fortuneswell, Isle of Portland, however, the section to Dorchester
was soon renumbered A354, presumably to create a link between the major port of Weymouth and the A30 at Salisbury, from where the route would continue to London. Such a route has now been superseded by the M27 and M3.

One of the worst accident spots on the A37 was the A371 junction just south of Shepton Mallet. The junction was always very busy and suffered long traffic queues due to the nature of the road. The junction was also a point where traffic would converge or pass through from multiple locations, this was further exacerbated by the A361 Glastonbury junction which backed right onto the first junction. This muddled configuration resulted in numerous road traffic accidents, many of which were fatal.

After a long campaign for the junction to be replaced, a roundabout was constructed in 1999 significantly improving road safety and traffic flow.  There have been few other construction schemes on the road in recent decades.

In recent years most of the overtaking lanes, provided on steep stretches just south of Bristol, have been blocked out with chevrons.

Future
A potential extension of the Avon Ring Road (A4174) from the Hicks Gate Roundabout between Keynsham and Bristol to the A37 south of Whitchurch would provide a direct link to the M32 and M4 north of Bristol.

References

External links

 SABRE page on the A37

Roads in England
Roads in Bristol
Roads in Dorset
Roads in Somerset